The Australian Wine Research Institute (AWRI) is a research institute with a focus on Australian wine, based in Adelaide, South Australia.

Location
It is based at the Wine Innovation Cluster, situated in the Waite Research Precinct, in the Adelaide suburb of Urrbrae, South Australia.

History
The institute was established in 1955 at the Waite campus of the University of Adelaide. It is funded by grape growers and wineries. Its first scientific chief was John Fornachon. An early researcher was Bryce Rankine, who later taught at the Roseworthy College, an oenology institution. The primary aim of the institute in the 1950s was to create good Australian table wines as opposed to traditional fortified wines. 

Research done by the institute has looked at "oxidation, hazes and deposits caused by trace amounts of iron and copper, and the need for better yeast strains, more effective use of sulphur dioxide, and pH control" as well as "research into new grape varieties".

See also
Australian and New Zealand Wine Industry Journal
Australian Society of Viticulture and Oenology
National Wine Centre of Australia
Wine Australia

References

External links
 

1955 establishments in Australia
Wine industry organizations
Alcohol industry trade associations
University of Adelaide